Totally Hits 2005 is an album in the Totally Hits album series.

Track listing
 Kelly Clarkson – "Since U Been Gone" 3:09
 Gavin DeGraw – "I Don't Want to Be" 3:36
 Mario – "Let Me Love You" 4:14
 Ciara featuring Missy Elliott – "1, 2 Step" 3:24
 Alicia Keys – "Karma" 3:38
 Fat Joe – "So Much More" 4:00
 Trillville featuring Cutty – "Some Cut" 4:14
 T.I. – "Bring 'Em Out" 3:37
 Fabolous – "Breathe" 4:30
 Fantasia – "Truth Is" 3:53
 Maroon 5 – "Sunday Morning" 4:02
 Ryan Cabrera – "True" 3:24
 Avril Lavigne – "Nobody's Home" 3:32
 Simple Plan – "Shut Up!" 3:01
 Trick Daddy – "Let's Go" 3:43
 Cassidy – "I'm a Hustla" 4:05
 Rupee – "Tempted to Touch" 3:43
 Tyler Hilton – "When It Comes" 3:45
 Anthony Hamilton – "Charlene" 4:09
 Tweet featuring Missy Elliott – "Turn da Lights Off" 3:39

References

External links
Barry A. Jeckell, BMG, Warner Ready Next 'Totally Hits' Disc, Billboard.com, April 15, 2005

Totally Hits
2005 compilation albums